Linda Louise Kochmar (née Stohosky, born October 25, 1944) is an American politician serving as the president of the Federal Way City Council since 2022. She has served as a member of the council since 2020, an office she previously held from 1998 to 2012. A member of the Republican Party, she previously served as a member of the Washington House of Representatives, representing the 30th district from 2013 to 2017.

References

1944 births
Living people
Republican Party members of the Washington House of Representatives
Women state legislators in Washington (state)
21st-century American politicians
21st-century American women politicians